Dickey is an unincorporated community in Calhoun County, in the U.S. state of Georgia.

History
A variant name was "Whitney". A post office called Dickey was established in 1889, and remained in operation until 1919.

The Georgia General Assembly incorporated Dickey as a town in 1900. The town's municipal charter was repealed in 1995.

References

Former municipalities in Georgia (U.S. state)
Unincorporated communities in Georgia (U.S. state)
Unincorporated communities in Calhoun County, Georgia
Populated places disestablished in 1995